Luis de Ossó Serra (17 October 1876 - 1 February 1931) was a Spanish footballer who played as a forward for FC Barcelona. He was one of the most important footballers in the amateur beginnings of FC Barcelona, being among the 12 founders of the club in 1899, and then serving the club as a forward for six years, netting 68 goals in 72 appearances, thus contributing decisively in the conquest of Barça's first official titles, 1901–02 Copa Macaya, which was the club's first-ever official title, 1902–03 Copa Barcelona and the 1904–05 Catalan championship.

Biography
Son of Jaime de Ossó and Teresa Serra, his uncle was San Enrique de Ossó i Cervelló, founding priest of the Congregation of the Teresianas who was canonized in 1993. Luis de Ossó owned a printing press and was a contributor to the weekly newspaper Los Deportes, where he published football chronicles under the pseudonym Un delantero ("A striker"). Like many other pioneer sportsmen of his time, he practiced multiple modalities such as equestrianism, cycling, skating, hiking, pelota and sailing, in addition to football. He was a member of several Barcelona sports clubs such as Skating-Ring, Club Velocipedico, and Club Regatas de Barcelona. He might have known Alberto Serra, a former Regatas member and once a director at Los Deportes, although there is little evidence for it.

He was one of the twelve men who attended the historic meeting held at the Gimnasio Solé on 29 November 1899 which saw the birth of Football Club Barcelona. In the founding meeting, Ossó was elected as secretary to the club's first board of directors, chaired by Walter Wild. Although in the first months of the club's life the changes in the board were constant, Ossó remained as secretary until 25 November 1901. He is considered the first patron of the club because he made Barça's very first economic investments, of which the most notable was getting the funds for the club's second playing field (the first having been Bonanova), a piece of land next to the Hotel Casanovas (where today the Hospital de Sant Pau stands). He negotiated with the owners of the hotel the lease of that land, in which Barça went on to dispute its games between 1900 and 1901. Later, between 23 August 1904 and 6 October 1905, during the presidency of Arthur Witty, he was again a member of the board. He was a personal friend of Joan Gamper.

Ossó went down in history as one of the ten footballers who played in Barcelona's official debut played ten days after its foundation at the Velódromo de la Bonanova against a team known as Team Anglès, which consisted of members of the British colony living in Barcelona. However, he did not often play in the following matches, preferring to play with the second team which he himself created in 1900 and of which he was the captain. With the club's subsidiary team which was mainly made up of Catalans, Ossó participated in marginal and less important games and won prestigious trophies such as Concurso Pergamí and the Medalla del Ayuntamiento, which were organized by the Spanish Gymnastics Federation.

Ossó participated in the conquest of the very first official titles of FC Barcelona: The inaugural edition of the Copa Macaya, the very first football competition played on the Iberian Peninsula, which ended in a narrow runner-up finish to Hispania AC. In the following season, however, Ossó played a crucial role in Barça's first-ever title, the 1901–02 Copa Macaya, netting once in a 9–0 win over Universitary SC and starting in the final matchday on 23 March 1902 in a 15–0 victory over Català FC. The Copa Macaya is now recognized as the first Catalan championship.

In 1903, he added a new title to his career, the Copa Barcelona, which was later recognized as the fourth edition of the Catalan Championship. Together with the likes of José Quirante, Romà Forns, Udo Steinberg and Carles Comamala, he helped Barça win the 1904–05 Catalan championship.

After his retirement, he remained very involved in FC Barcelona, of which he was a patron. However, health problems and, above all, discrepancies with Joan Gamper caused him to leave the club. Although both had initially maintained a good friendship, Ossó, a Catholic, did not share the approaches of a Protestant Swiss like Gamper.

Legend of the origin of the shield of FC Barcelona
Traditionally, the figure of Ossó has been associated with the origin of the current FC Barcelona shield. Initially, the club used the shield of the city of Barcelona as its emblem, but they soon decided to create one of their own. In an assembly to choose their own shield, the partners could not agree and, at one point in the debate, the secretary Ossó shouted: "Això is a pot of grills!", a Catalan set phrase to refer to a great uproar. According to this version of events, the phrase would have inspired Gamper, who drew a shield in the shape of a pot, where he fitted the symbols of the Barcelona shield, adding the azulgrana colors. Today this version of events is considered a legend and it is believed that the current coat of arms was chosen after a contest for that purpose, won by Carlos Comamala.

Death
Luis de Ossó died in Barcelona on 20 February 1931, at the age of 54.

Honours
FC Barcelona
 Copa Macaya: 
 Champions: 1901–02
 Runner-up: 1900–01

 Copa Barcelona:
 Champions: 1902–03

 Catalan championship
 Champions (1): 1904–05

FC Barcelona B
 Concurso Pergamí
 Champions: 1902

 Medalla del Ayuntamiento
 Champions: 1902

References

1876 births
1931 deaths
Spanish footballers
Footballers from Barcelona
Association football forwards
FC Barcelona players
Spanish sports journalists